Margaret Clark may refer to:
 Margaret Clark (arsonist) (died 1680)
 Peggy Clark or Margaret Brownson Clark (1915–1996), American lighting designer, costume designer, and set designer
 M. Margaret Clark (1925–2003),  American medical anthropologist
 Margaret Formby née Clark (1929–2003), American educator and founder of the National Cowgirl Museum and Hall of Fame
 Margaret Clark (academic) (born 1941), New Zealand professor of politics
 Margaret Clark (Australian writer) (born 1942), Australian author for children and young adults
 Margaret Clark (psychologist) (fl. 1970s–2010s), American social psychologist
 Margaret Clark (American writer) (born 1964), American historian, writer, and educator
 Margaret Clark (politician) (fl. 1990s–2010s), councilwoman and former mayor of Rosemead, California, US
 Maggie Clark, a character in "When You and I Were Young, Maggie"

See also
 Marguerite Clark (1883–1940), actress
 Margaret Clarke (disambiguation)
 Peggy Clarke (disambiguation)